The Democratic Republican Party for Renewal ( - PRDR) is a political party in Mauritania. Formerly known as the Democratic and Social Republican Party, (PRDS) the party changed its identity and adjusted its political stance after the 2005 coup. Formerly very supportive of President Maaouya Ould Sid'Ahmed Taya and his pro-Israeli policy, after the 2005 coup the party denounced Taya's policies and the mid-2006 Israeli military campaign in Lebanon.

In the 2001 parliamentary elections the party won 64 out of 81 seats. Sidi Mohamed Ould Boubacar, one of the bloc's members, was nominated as Prime Minister a few days after the 2005 coup.

The PRDR won seven seats in the November–December 2006 parliamentary election and in the 21 January and 4 February 2007 Senate elections, 3 out of 56 seats.

, the PRDR is part of the Mithaq El Wihda coalition and is led by Sidi Mohamed Ould Mohamed Vall.

Electoral history

Presidential elections

National Assembly elections

Senate elections

References

External links
Official web site
PRDR Condemns Israel

Political parties in Mauritania